"These Are the Days" is the second solo single by English singer-songwriter Ian McNabb. Like "Great Dreams of Heaven", it was first released in 1991. It was allegedly re-released in 1993 in limited quantities, taken from the album, Truth and Beauty.

Track listings
1991 release
CD and 12"
 "These Are the Days" (4:32)
 "Trams in Amsterdam" (3:45)
 "Great Dreams of Heaven" (Acoustic) (4:58)

7"
 "These Are the Days" (Radio Edit) (3:48)
 "Trams in Amsterdam" (3:43)

References

Ian McNabb songs
1991 singles
1991 songs